The Bunker Hill Covered Bridge is one of two covered bridges left in North Carolina, (the other being the Pisgah Covered Bridge in Randolph County), and is possibly the last wooden bridge in the United States with Haupt truss construction. It was built in 1895 by Andrew Loretz Ramsour (1817–1906) in Claremont, North Carolina, and crosses Lyle Creek. 

The bridge was designated a National Historic Civil Engineering Landmark by the American Society of Civil Engineers in 2001 and is also listed on the National Register of Historic Places.

History and design
The project to build the bridge was started in 1894 when Catawba County Commissioners requested nearby owners of the Bunker Hill Farm to build and maintain a bridge that would cross Lyle Creek on the old Island Ford Road (a former Native American trail). According to local archives, Ramsour found the Haupt truss design in a book. Since the bridge was originally constructed as an open span, its  roof wasn't added until 1900, and in 1921, its original wooden shingle roof was replaced with a tin roof. The bridge was owned by the Bolick family until 1985 when they donated it to the Catawba County Historical Association, who restored it in 1994.

See also
List of bridges documented by the Historic American Engineering Record in North Carolina

References

External links

Bridges completed in 1895
Buildings and structures in Catawba County, North Carolina
Covered bridges on the National Register of Historic Places in North Carolina
Historic Civil Engineering Landmarks
Wooden bridges in North Carolina
Transportation in Catawba County, North Carolina
Tourist attractions in Catawba County, North Carolina
Historic American Engineering Record in North Carolina
National Register of Historic Places in Catawba County, North Carolina
Road bridges on the National Register of Historic Places in North Carolina
1895 establishments in North Carolina